Ponhea Kraek District is a district (srok) located in Tboung Khmum Province, Cambodia. The district capital is Ponhea Kraek town located around 48 kilometres east of the provincial capital of Kampong Cham by road. Ponhea Kraek is a border district and the city of Tây Ninh in Vietnam is around 57 kilometres away by road. The district also lies on the border between Tboung Khmum and Prey Veng Province.

The district is easily accessed by road from Kampong Cham city, Kratié or Tây Ninh. The Krek Rubber plantation covers much of the northern part of the district. There is an official international border crossing 13 kilometres south east of the district capital at Trapeang Phlong. Ponhea Kreak town lies on National Highway 7 between Tboung Khmum and Kratié.

Location 
Ponhea Kraek district is a southern district in Tboung Khmum Province and shares a border with both Vietnam and Prey Veng Province. Reading from the north clockwise, Ponhea Kraek shares a border with Dambae district to the north. The eastern border of the district is shared with Memot District of Tboung Khmum and the Vietnamese Province of Tây Ninh, which also wraps around to the southern district border. To the south are Kamchay Mear and Kanhchriech districts of Prey Veng. The western border of the district abuts Ou Reang Ov and Tboung Khmum districts of Tboung Khmum province.

Cambodia's oldest man 
Ponhea Kraek district was the home and birthplace of Sek Yi, reported to be the oldest ever Cambodian and one of the oldest people in the world. His grandson reported that he was born in 1883, in either January or February in a small village in the south-east province of what was then Kampong Cham. During two marriages, Sek Yi had twelve children who together produced 70 grandchildren, and an estimated 420 great-grandchildren. He outlived half of his 12 children, all of whom lived to 70 or 80. Sek Yi died in his home in Ponhea Kraek in October 2003, aged 120 years old.

Administration 
The Ponhea Kraek district governor reports to the Governor of Tboung Khmum. The following table shows the villages of Ponhea Kraek district by commune.

Demographics 
The district is subdivided into 8 communes (khum) and 152 villages (phum). According to the 1998 Census, the population of the district was 123,879 persons in 24,261 households in 1998. With a population of over 120,000 people, Ponhea Kraek district has one of the largest district populations in Tboung Khmum province after Tboung Khmum District. The average household size in Ponhea Kraek is 5.1 persons per household, which is slightly lower than the rural average for Cambodia (5.2 persons). The sex ratio in the district is 93.3%, with significantly more females than males.

References 

Districts of Tboung Khmum province